Opharus nigrocinctus is a moth of the family Erebidae. It was described by Walter Rothschild in 1935. It is found in the Brazilian states of Rio Grande do Sul and Santa Catarina.

References

Opharus
Moths described in 1935
Moths of South America